Mira is a surname. Notable people with the surname include:
 Antonietta Mira, Italian statistician
 Aurora Mira (1863–1939), Chilean painter 
 Brigitte Mira (1910–2005), German actress
 George Mira (born 1942), American retired National Football League quarterback
 George Mira Jr. (born c. 1965), American former college football player, son of the above
 Joan Francesc Mira i Casterà (born 1939), Valencian writer, anthropologist and sociologist
 José Palau Mira (born 1992), Spanish footballer
 Matt Mira (born 1983), American comedian
 Na Mira (born 1982), American artist, educator
 Nick Mira (born 2000), American record producer and songwriter
 Pasqual Maragall i Mira (born 1941), Spanish politician
 Pedro Solbes Mira (born 1942), Spanish economist and government minister

Catalan-language surnames